Francis Xavier "Frank" Gorman (born November 11, 1937 in New York, New York) is a former American diver. He represented the United States at the 1964 Summer Olympics in Tokyo, where he received a silver medal in men's 3 metre springboard. Gorman's finish was part of a 1964 Olympic springboard diving medal sweep for the American team, with Ken Sitzberger and Larry Andreasen placing first and third, respectively.

He graduated from Harvard University.

References

External links
 

1937 births
Living people
Divers at the 1964 Summer Olympics
Olympic silver medalists for the United States in diving
Sportspeople from New York City
American male divers

Medalists at the 1964 Summer Olympics
Harvard Crimson men's divers
20th-century American people
21st-century American people